Sestini is an Italian luxury fashion brand founded in 2020 by Carlo Sestini and headquartered in Florence, Italy. The brand produces sustainable handcrafted sunglasses.

History 
Sestini was launched in April 2020. Composed of three models only, all in limited quantities, the brand focused on producing sustainable products. The sunglasses have Carl Zeiss lenses and are made out of metal or recycled acetate. Sestini partners with the NGO One Tree Planted and is committed to implementing a circular economic model by 2025.

In 2022, Sestini launched its second collection called Insieme. The brand has an e-commerce platform.

Collaborations 
The brand started to collaborate with other brands in the luxury world, quickly gaining attention. The first exclusive pair was launched in 2020 in collaboration with Italian retailer LuisaViaRoma. The pair was available both online and in their main store in Florence. Later, in 2022, Sestini partnered with the French luxury resort Eden Rock, St Barths for another collaboration inspired by the Caribbean Sea. More recently, MODES and Sestini launched  a limited edition pair available only in Italy.

Links 



Fashion
Luxury brands
Sunglasses
Eyewear brands
Italian brands